814 Naval Air Squadron or 814 NAS, nicknamed the Flying Tigers, is a squadron of the Royal Navy Fleet Air Arm. It is currently equipped with the AgustaWestland Merlin HM2 anti-submarine warfare helicopter and is based at Royal Naval Air Station (RNAS) Culdrose in Cornwall. The squadron was formed in December 1938 and has been disbanded and reformed several times.

Role and equipment 
814 Naval Air Squadron operates the AgustaWestland Merlin HM2 anti-submarine warfare (ASW) helicopter and is based at RNAS Culdrose in Cornwall. In addition to its ASW role, it has capabilities in anti-piracy operations, delivery of humanitarian aid, casualty evacuation, medium lift under-slung loads (up to 3.8 tonnes), search and rescue, counter drugs and maritime patrol and security operations. The Merlin can be armed with BAE Systems Sting Ray torpedoes, Mark 11 depth charges and the Browning M3m .50 calibre machine gun.

The squadron has over 200 personnel assigned to it and is the largest ever Merlin Fleet Air Arm squadron.

History

Second World War 
814 Naval Air Squadron was formed in December 1938 as a torpedo reconnaissance squadron equipped with six Fairey Swordfish Mk I.

West Africa 
Originally embarked on aircraft carrier HMS Ark Royal in January 1939, it transferred to HMS Hermes at the outbreak of the Second World War. HMS Hermes set sail for West Africa where the squadron helped search for the German cruiser Admiral Graf Spee. It also took part in the Battle of Dakar, damaging the Vichy French battleship Richelieu on 8 July 1940. Heavy anti-aircraft fire meant the squadron only achieved a single hit, however the battleship was out-of-action for over a year as a result. For its participation in the Battle of the Atlantic during 1940, the squadron received its only battle honour.

Indian Ocean 
HMS Hermes and the squadron travelled to the Indian Ocean in December 1940. The squadron went on to provide support for land forces in British Somaliland in East Africa, during which five enemy merchant ships were captured. In May 1941, the squadron provided support to the Royal Air Force (RAF) in Iraq and later provided convoy protection in the Indian Ocean. In April 1942, while the squadron was ashore, HMS Hermes was sunk by Japanese aircraft off Ceylon (now Sri Lanka) whilst transiting between Trincomalee and the Maldives. 814 NAS subsequently disbanded during December 1942 at Katukurunda in Ceylon.

Far East 
The squadron reformed at RNAS Stretton in Cheshire during July 1944, now equipped with the Fairey Barracuda Mk II, a torpedo and dive bomber.

Cold War 
In post-war years, the squadron was equipped with the Fairey Firefly, Grumman Avenger and Fairey Gannet in the anti-submarine warfare (ASW) role on-board , receiving the Boyd Trophy for its high standard of operational efficiency in 1951.

In 1960, the squadron continued in the ASW role and was equipped with its first helicopter, the Westland Whirlwind HAS.7, later replaced with the Westland Wessex HAS.1. The Wessex HAS.3 was introduced in 1967, providing the squadron with its first radar-equipped helicopter. In 1968, 814 NAS was again awarded the Boyd Trophy, on this occasion for achieving a high state of operational effectiveness at sea with the Wessex HAS.3. The squadron decommissioned for a second time in July 1970.

Sea King 
The squadron reformed at RNAS Prestwick (HMS Gannet) in Aryshire during March 1973, equipped with four Westland Sea King HAS.1 helicopters, a variant specialising in ASW. It embarked on tours of duty with HMS Bulwark and HMS Hermes, assisting with the evacuation of British citizens during the 1974 Turkish invasion of Cyprus. That same year the squadron received the Australia Shield for its high standard of operational readiness. The Sea King HAS.2 was introduced in 1977, making the squadron the first in the Royal Navy to operate a helicopter with passive sonar equipment. 814 NAS relocated from Prestwick to Royal Naval Air Station (RNAS) Culdrose in Cornwall on 9 April 1976 and has since remained there. By the end of 1976 the unit strength had increased to nine helicopters. 

The squadron became a full member of the NATO Tiger Association in 1979, an organisation with the aim of promoting solidarity between air-forces of NATO.

By the time of the Falklands War in April 1982, the upgraded Sea King HAS.5 had entered service with the squadron and in August 1982 it embarked on HMS Illustrious for South Atlantic patrols. Capability was further enhanced in October 1990 when 814 NAS re-equipped with the Sea King HAS.6. This variant of the Sea King saw action with the squadron whilst operating from the carrier HMS Invincible during the Gulf War in 1991 and later in the Bosnian War and Kosovo Wars. In December 2000, the unit was decommissioned for the third time.

21st century 
The squadron was reformed in October 2001 at RNAS Culdrose, now equipped with the AgustaWestland Merlin HM1. The Merlin replaced the Fleet Air Arm's anti-submarine warfare Sea Kings and is designed to be deployed aboard ships or operate from shore in a variety of maritime roles.

The squadron's Merlin's have seen operational service aboard HMS Illustrious, during the Iraq War (Operation Telic) and in the wider Persian Gulf area. In May 2012 it was involved in Exercise Joint Warrior off the coast of Scotland again with HMS Illustrious.

The London 2012 Olympics saw the squadron deploy to RNAS Yeovilton in Somerset to perform maritime security operations. Yeovilton's location allowed the squadron's Merlins to quickly access amphibious transport dock HMS Bulwark, which was acting as the police command unit for the Olympic Sailing Regatta taking place in Weymouth Bay.

During December 2014, the Merlin HM1 was replaced with the Merlin HM2. The upgraded aircraft features a new mission system, digital cockpit, electro-optical camera and multi-static sonar system.

For a two-week period in early 2016, two aircraft and over sixty personnel from 814 NAS took part if Exercise Dynamic Manta 16 in the Mediterranean. Based at Naval Air Station Sigonella in Sicilly, the unit worked alongside eight other NATO nations during the major anti-submarine warfare exercise. The squadron returned for the 2017 exercise, when they were again based at Sigonella and the 2018 exercise, when they were based at Catania - Fontanarossa Naval Air Station, also in Sicily.

The aircraft and personnel of 829 Naval Air Squadron, also based at RNAS Culdrose, merged with 814 NAS in March 2018, creating the largest ever Merlin Fleet Air Arm squadron.

Aircraft operated
The squadron has operated a variety of different aircraft and variants.

 Fairey Swordfish Mk I (1938–1942)
 Fairey Barracuda Mk II
 Fairey Firefly FR.1, FR.4, Mk 5 and AS.6
 Grumman Avenger AS.4 and AS.5
 Fairey Gannet AS.4 and T.2
 Westland Whirlwind HAS.7
 Westland Wessex HAS.1 and HAS.3
 Westland Sea King HAS.1, HAS.2/2a, HAS.5 and HAS.6 (1973–2000)
 AgustaWestland Merlin HM1 and HM2 (2000 – present)

Squadron traditions and affiliations

Traditions 
The squadron nickname is 'the Flying Tigers' and its badge features a tiger's head, representing its membership of the NATO Tiger Association.

Affiliations 
The following organisations are affiliated with the squadron.
 Devon and Cornwall Constabulary
 The Gold and Silver Wyre Drawers
 Leicester Tigers (Rugby team)
 NATO Tiger Association
 Solent University Royal Naval Unit
 Treliske Hospital (Royal Cornwall Hospital)
 Erewash Borough Council (Derbyshire)

References

Citations

Bibliography

External links
814 Naval Air Squadron on Royal Navy website

Military units and formations established in 1938
800 series Fleet Air Arm squadrons
Military of the United Kingdom in Cornwall